Andrea Spendolini-Sirieix (born 11 September 2004) is a British professional diver. In her breakthrough year of 2022, she became a World junior, two-time European senior, two-time Commonwealth Games and two-time national senior champion across 10 metre platform and 10 metre synchronised platform events, as well as a World senior medalist in the team event.

She made her international debut in 2018 as a thirteen year old, and won her first solo international gold medal at the 2020 FINA Diving Grand Prix. Later that year Spendolini-Sirieix was recognised as the BBC Young Sports Personality of the Year. She won the gold for the women's individual 10 metre platform at her first Commonwealth Games, in 2022, the first English woman to win the event since 1966. Two weeks later, she became European Champion in the same event, representing Great Britain. Sirieix went on to win a further gold at each event in the synchronised discipline; in the women's event at the European Championships with Lois Toulson, and at the 10 metre mixed synchro event at the 2022 Commonwealth Games with Noah Williams.

Early life

Andrea Spendolini-Sirieix was born in London on 11 September 2004, the daughter of French hotel host Fred Sirieix and his ex-wife Italian Alex Spendolini.

Career
At the British Diving Championships in 2018, Spendolini-Sirieix and her colleague from Crystal Palace Diving Club, Josie Zillig, won the women's 10m synchronised diving event, completing five dives as the only entrants. The following year, partnering Emily Martin, she won Women's synchronised diving competition at the Junior European Championships in Kazan.

Spendolini-Sirieix won a solo gold at the British Diving Championships in the Women's 10m Platform competition in 2020, and a few weeks later won her first international gold medal at the FINA Grand Prix in Rostock in February 2020. Having been in second place during the first four rounds in Rostock, she achieved a score of 76.80 on her final dive to win with a total of 330.50, ahead of Celina Toth who scored a total of 329.35.

Spendolini-Sirieix earned her place as the youngest member of the Team GB diving team at Tokyo 2020 after a string of eye-catching performances over the previous two years, including two medals at the 2021 European Championships. In Tokyo, aged only 16, Andrea went through the rounds and reached the Olympic final in the Women's 10m Platform, ultimately finishing seventh. 

She was selected as the BBC Young Sports Personality of the Year in 2020, and was shortlisted again in 2022.

In May 2021, Spendolini-Sirieix and Noah Williams won a silver medal in the 10m mixed synchro event at the 2020 European Aquatics Championships. She also won a bronze in individual 10m platform at the Championships.

In August 2022, she won two gold medals, in the Women's 10m platform and the Mixed Pairs Synchronised 10m platform with Noah Williams, and a silver medal, in the Women's Synchronised 10m platform with Eden Cheng, at the Commonwealth Games in Birmingham.

Career highlights

A. with Josie Zilling (there were no other entrants) 
B. with Emily Martin 
C. with Noah Williams

References

External links 
 

{{ |url=https://www.britishswimming.org/athlete-swimming-profiles/diving-team-profiles/andrea-spendolini-sirieix/}}

2004 births
Living people
English female divers
Divers at the 2020 Summer Olympics
Olympic divers of Great Britain
English people of French descent
English people of Italian descent
World Aquatics Championships medalists in diving
Divers at the 2022 Commonwealth Games
Commonwealth Games medallists in diving
Commonwealth Games gold medallists for England
Commonwealth Games silver medallists for England
21st-century British women
Sportspeople from London
Medallists at the 2022 Commonwealth Games